Boguszówka may refer to any of the following places in Poland:

 Boguszówka, Masovian Voivodeship, a village in Gmina Gniewoszów, Kozienice County
 Boguszówka, Podkarpackie Voivodeship, a village in Gmina Bircza, Przemyśl County